Love Is Real is an EP by Edith Frost, released in 1999 through Drag City.

Critical reception
CMJ New Music Report called it "a captivating display of the talents of Ms. Frost."

Track listing

Personnel 
Musicians
Edith Frost – vocals, guitar
Mark Greenberg – organ
Ryan Hembrey – bass guitar
Archer Prewitt – guitar, drums
Rick Rizzo – guitar
Production and additional personnel
Phil Bonnet – mixing, recording
Sam Prekop – painting
Rian Murphy – production
Alexis Wilson – photography

References 

1999 EPs
Drag City (record label) EPs
Edith Frost albums